The Lake Michigan Conference is an interscholastic athletic conference affiliated with the Michigan High School Athletic Association. It is located in Northern Michigan and contains eight teams that encompasses six counties: Antrim County, Charlevoix County, Crawford County, Emmet County, Grand Traverse County, and Kalkaska County.

History
The Lake Michigan Conference traces it origins to the Great Northern Conference, which began play in 1990. The conference was split into four divisions, by geography and school size. The Lake Michigan Division consisted of Class C schools;  East Jordan, Boyne City, Charlevoix, Elk Rapids, Kalkaska, Mancelona, Traverse City St. Francis and Harbor Springs. Kalkaska played in the Lake Huron Division for football only with: Lincoln-Alcona, Grayling, Whittemore-Prescott, Onaway and Rogers City. 

In 1993, Mancelona dropped to the smaller Ski-Valley for all sports. The Great Northern Conference dissolved in 1997, with most of the divisions retaining all their league memberships. The Lake Michigan Division, re-branded as the Lake Michigan Conference, with Kalkaska joining for football.  The membership stayed the same until 2003, when Grayling, a former Lake Huron Division Rival of Kalkaska, left the Northeast Michigan Conference.  This gave the conference the 8 teams that it has today. In 2010, conference athletic directors voted to eliminate St. Francis from participating in football effective in 2012. Elk Rapids and Grayling agreed to continue their series, while St. Francis will play two other LMC teams on a three-year rotation. The LMC also extended an invitation to St. Ignace High School to join. On January 14, 2011, it was announced that St. Ignace would join the Ski-Valley Conference. 

Following the 2013 season the LMC and the neighboring Northwest Conference merged for football only, creating the Northern Michigan Football League. The league was split into two divisions based on enrollment and competitiveness. The Leader division consisted of the larger and more accomplished programs including, St. Francis, Maple City-Glen Lake, Elk Rapids, Boyne City, Kingsley, Benzie Central and Grayling. The Legacy Division consisted of Frankfort, Charlevoix, Kalkaska, East Jordan, Suttons Bay and Harbor Springs. Mesick, an original member of the Northwest Conference, opted against joining the NMFL and instead joined the five schools of the Mid-State North Conference, creating the Northwestern Six Football League.

In 2023, amidst discussion of removing St. Francis from the conference for competitive balancing purposes, or Kalkaska possibly leaving the conference. East Jordan announced it would be joining the Ski-Valley Conference, citing its low enrollment being better suited amongst the smaller schools of the Ski-Valley.

Members
Full member institutions include: Departing Members are highlighted in pink.

Former members

Membership timeline

Lake Michigan stopped sponsoring football in 2014.

Football
Conference Champions

*State Champion

Teams in the Final Regular Season Rankings

Conference Records

State Championship Results

Results by team

All-Time Playoff Appearances

Traverse City St. Francis:(35) 1983,85-87,1990-2011,13-22

Boyne City:(21) 1993-94,96,2001-09,12-17,20-22

Grayling:(16) 1990,92,2003-05,07,09-13,15-17,20-21

Charlevoix:(12) 1992,2000,05-06,08-09,14,16,19-22

Elk Rapids:(10) 2006-10,13-14,17-18,20,22

Harbor Springs: (8) 1986,1999-2000,15-16,18-20

East Jordan:(8) 1993-94,1999-2000,03,20-22

Kalkaska:(5) 2002,12-13,16,20

Girls Volleyball 
Conference Champions

State Championship Appearances

Boys Cross Country 
Conference Champions

State Final Finishes

Individual State Champions

Girls Cross Country 
Conference Champions

State Final Finishes

Individual State Champion

Boys Soccer 
Conference Champions

 St. Francis has a Co-Op program with Traverse City Christian, who is the host program, and Grand Traverse Academy.

State Championship Appearances

Girls Golf 
Conference Champions

State Final Finishes

Individual State Champion

Boys Tennis 
Conference Champions

Individual State Champion

Girls Tennis 
Conference Champions

Individual State Champions

Boys Basketball
Conference Champions

Conference Records

Through 2022-23

State Championship Appearances

Girls Basketball
Conference Champions

Conference Records

1997-98 to 2022-23

State Championship Appearances

Wrestling
Conference Champions

Individual State Champions

Boys Skiing
Conference Champions

St. Francis and Elk Rapids were a co-op for their 2014,2016 & 2017 championships. Great North Alpine was a co-op between St. Francis, Elk Rapids, Central Lake and Grand Traverse Academy.

Girls Skiing
Conference Champions

Baseball
Conference Champions

State Championship Appearances

Softball
Conference Champions

State Championship Appearances

Boys Track
Conference Champions

Individual State Champions

Girls Track
Conference Champions

Individual State Champions

Bold= MHSAA Girls Track & Field Final Meet Records

Boys Golf
Conference Champions

State Final Finishes

1997- none

1998- none

1999- none

2000- Charlevoix 3rd D3, St. Francis 8th D4, Harbor Springs 9th D4

2001- Elk Rapids 12th D3, Harbor Springs 2nd D4, St. Francis 3rd D4

2002- Charlexoix 15th D3, Harbor Springs 3rd D4, St. Francis 4th D4

2003- Grayling 3rd D3, Charlevoix 15th D3, St. Francis 3rd* D4, Harbor Springs 12th D4

2004- Grayling 2nd D3, St. Francis 1st D4

2005- St. Francis 2nd D4

2006- Elk Rapids 15th D3, St. Francis 2nd D4, Harbor Springs 4th D4

2007- none

2008- St. Francis 1st D4, Harbor Springs 10th D4

2009- Charlevoix 12th D3, St. Francis 3rd D4, Habor Springs 6th D4

2010- Charlevoix 8th D3

2011- Charlevoix 7th D3, St. Francis 11th D4

2012- none

2013- Charlevoix 13th D3, Harbor Springs 12th D4

2014- Kalkaska 3rd D3, Charlevoix 2nd D4, St. Francis 6th D4

2015- St. Francis 11th D4

2016- Harbor Springs 8th D4

2017- Charlevoix 8th D3, Harbor Springs 9th D4

2018- Charlevoix 10th D3, Elk Rapids 13th D3

2019- Elk Rapids 6th D3

2021- Elk Rapids 9th D3, Boyne City 10th D3, Charlevoix 4th D4, Harbor Springs 15th D4

2022- St. Francis 4th D3, Boyne City 12th D3, Charlevoix 5th D4

 St. Francis was in a three way tie for 1st place. Due to tiebreakers they finished 3rd.

Individual Champion

Girls Soccer
Conference Champions

 St. Francis hosts a Co-Op program with Traverse City Christian and Grand Traverse Academy.

State Championship Appearances

State Champions By School
Boyne City: Boys Track and Field, 1957,1958; Girl Skiing, 2007 (3)

Charlevoix: Boys Cross Country 1982,1983,1987,1988,1989,1990,1991 (7)

East Jordan: Boys Tennis 1955; Boys Cross Country, 1998,2000 (3)

Elk Rapids: Boys Soccer, 1997–98; Girls Skiing, 2016; Boys Skiing, 2019 (4)

Grayling: Boys Basketball, 1917  (1)

Harbor Springs: Boys Basketball, 1929; Boys Cross Country, 2002,2003,2004; Girls Cross Country, 2008,2009; Boys Skiing, 1996,2003,2005–06,2010; Girls Skiing, 1987,1988,2000,2001,2002,2003,2004,2012; Girls Track 2015; Girls Golf 2017,2018 (22)

Kalkaska: Boys Basketball, 1916 (1)

Traverse City St. Francis: Baseball, 1990; Boys Bowling, 2004; Girls Cross Country, 2003,2015,2016,2022; Football, 1992,1999,2003,2005,2008,2009; Boys Golf, 2004,2008; Girls Skiing, 2005, 2016; Boys Skiing, 2019; Girls Track and Field 2013, Boys Tennis 2021 (19)

Athletes Who Participated In NCAA Division I Athletics

Other Notable Athletes 

Damon Sheehy-Guiseppi, St. Francis — professional football player with the Cleveland Browns

Angus MacLellan, St. Francis — professional rugby player with the United States national rugby union team

References

External links
Boyne City Public Schools
Charlevoix Public Schools
East Jordan Public Schools
Elk Rapids Public Schools
Grayling Public Schools
Harbor Springs Public Schools
Kalkaska Public Schools
Grand Traverse Catholic Schools

Michigan high school sports conferences
High school sports conferences and leagues in the United States
Northern Michigan